James, Jim, Jimmy, or Jamie Clark may refer to:

Crime
 James Clark (lynching victim) (died 1926), accused of rape, lynched by a mob of white men
 James Lee Clark (1968–2007), convicted killer, executed by the state of Texas
 Jim Clark (criminal) (1902–1974), American bank robber and Depression-era outlaw
 James Clark (criminal) (1902–1974), Depression-era bank robber known as "Oklahoma Jack"

Entertainment
 James Clark (artist) (1858–1943), English painter
 James B. Clark (director) (1908–2000), American film and television director
 Jim Clark (film editor) (1931–2016), editor of The Killing Fields
 Jimmy Clark (tap dancer) (1922–2009), member of the tap dancing duo The Clark Brothers

Politics

U.S.
 Champ Clark (James Beauchamp Clark, 1850–1921), Speaker of the US House of Representatives, 1911–1919
 James Clark Jr. (1918–2006), Maryland State Senate president
 James Clark (Kentucky politician) (1779–1839), Governor of Kentucky, 1836–1839
 James Clark (Pennsylvania politician) (born 1952), Pennsylvania politician

 James Clark (Minnesota politician) (born 1963), member of the Minnesota House of Representatives
 James S. Clark (1921–2000), Alabama politician
 James Waddey Clark (1877–1939), Justice of the Oklahoma Supreme Court from 1925 to 1933
 James West Clark (1779–1843), North Carolina congressman
 Jim Clark (Alaska official) (born 1943), former chief of staff to Alaska Governor Frank Murkowski

Elsewhere
 James Johnston Clark (1809–1891), Unionist MP for County Londonderry, Ireland
 James Lenox-Conyngham Chichester-Clark (1884–1933), MP in Northern Ireland
 James Clark (businessman) (1833–1898), mayor of Auckland, New Zealand
 James B. Clark (Canadian politician) (1867–1943), from Ontario
 James Clark (Ontario politician) (1888–1952), Speaker of the Ontario Legislature, 1939–1943
 Jim Clark (Australian politician) (1891–1963), member of the Queensland Legislative Assembly
 James Chichester-Clark (1923–2002), Prime Minister of Northern Ireland, 1969–1971
 James Clark (British diplomat) (born 1963), Ambassador to Luxembourg
 James Clark (Dunedin mayor) (1870–1936), New Zealand politician

Sports

Baseball and cricket
 Jim Clark (infielder) (1927–1990), American baseball infielder
 Jim Clark (1910s outfielder) (1887–1969), American baseball outfielder
 Jim Clark (1970s outfielder) (1947–2019), American baseball outfielder
 James Clark (Australian cricketer) (1871–1941), Australian cricketer
 James Clark (New Zealand cricketer) (1910–2003), New Zealand cricketer

Football and rugby
 James Clark (American football) (1909–?), American football player
 Jim Clark (offensive lineman) (1929–2000), American football player
 Jim Clark (American football coach) (born, c. 1926), American football coach
 Jim Clark (Australian footballer) (1925–2013), in the Victorian Football League
 Jimmy Clark (footballer, born 1913) (1913–?), Scottish professional footballer
 Jim Clark (Scottish footballer) (1923–1994), Scottish footballer
 Jamie Clark (footballer) (born 1976), Scottish soccer coach and former footballer
 Jimmy Clark (rugby union) (1908–1979), Australian national rugby union team captain
 Jim Clark (rugby league) (fl. 1913–1927), a New Zealand rugby league player
 Jamie Clark (rugby league) (born 1987), English rugby league player
 James Clark (footballer, born 2001), English footballer

Other sports
 Jimmy Clark (boxer) (1914–1994), American Olympic boxer
 Jimmy Clark (golfer) (1920–2010), American professional golfer
 James Clark (sport shooter) (born 1936), American Olympic shooter
 Jim Clark (1936–1968), Scottish Formula one world drivers' champion in the 1960s
 Jim Clark (rower) (born 1950), British rower
 James Clark (shinty) (born 1973), shinty player from Invergarry, Scotland
 James Clark (water polo) (born 1991), Australian water polo goalkeeper
 James Clark (athlete), marathon runner
 Jim Clark (ice hockey) (born 1954), director of scouting for the Ottawa Senators
 Jamie Clark (darts player), Scottish darts player

Other
 James Clark (physician in Dominica) (1737–1819), Scottish doctor and plantation owner
 Sir James Clark, 1st Baronet (1788–1870), royal physician to Queen Victoria
 James Clark (college president) (1812–1892), president of Washington College
 James Clark (horticulturist) (1825–1890), English potato breeder
 James G. Clark (Medal of Honor) (1843–1911), American Civil War soldier
 James L. Clark (1883–1969), American natural history scientist
 James A. Clark Sr. (1886–1955), judge in Maryland
 Jim Clark (sheriff) (James Gardner Clark, Jr., 1922–2007), Dallas County, Alabama sheriff
 A. James Clark (1927–2015), American construction executive and philanthropist
 James H. Clark (born 1944), Internet entrepreneur
 James Clark (programmer) (born 1964), computer programmer
 James B. Clark Jr. (1957–1996), American executed for the murder of his adoptive parents
 Jamie Rappaport Clark (born 1957/8), president and CEO of Defenders of Wildlife

See also
 James Clarke (disambiguation)
 James B. Clark (disambiguation)
 Clark (surname)